Evelyn Anite Kajik, commonly known as Evelyn Anite, is a Ugandan journalist and politician. She is the State Minister of Finance for Investment and Privatization in the Ugandan Cabinet since 6 June 2016. Previously, she served as State Minister for Youth. She was appointed to that position on 1 March 2015, replacing Ronald Kibuule, who was appointed State Minister for Water Resources. She also served as the elected Member of Parliament for Koboko Municipality, in the West Nile sub-region, in the Northern Region of Uganda, a position she occupied from 2011 until 2021. In the 2020 National Resistance Movement (NRM) primary elections, Anite lost to Dr Charles Ayume, the son of former speaker of the Ugandan Parliament, the late Francis Ayume.

Background and education
Anite was born on 11 November 1984, in Adakado Village, Koboko District, to Steven Dravu, a civil servant, and Sarah Wokoru Dravu, a businesswoman. She belongs to the Lugbara-speaking Ugandans whose native area spills into the neighboring Democratic Republic of the Congo. She is fluent in both Lugbara and Kakwa languages. She attended Arua Hill Primary School for her elementary school education. She studied at Saint Mary's Ediofe Secondary School for her O-Level studies. She transferred to Muni Girls' Secondary School, for her A-Level education. She holds the degree of Bachelor of Arts in Mass Communication, awarded by Uganda Christian University in 2008.

In January 2018, Evelyn Anite was admitted to the Fletcher School of Law and Diplomacy of Tufts University, in Medford, Massachusetts, in the United States, to pursue the Master in International Relations and Diplomacy Programme. In July 2019, Anite graduated from Tufts University, having met all the requirements for the Master of Arts program.

Career
Right out of high school in 2005, Anite started working as a radio presenter at a radio station in Arua, continuing in that capacity intermittently until 2007. Beginning in 2006 and continuing until 2010, she worked as a radio presenter at Uganda Broadcasting Corporation in Kampala, Uganda's capital and largest city. From 2008 until 2010, she worked at the Uganda Media Centre as the Public Affairs Assistant for International Relations. In 2011, she contested for the parliamentary seat of Youth Representative for Northern Uganda. She beat nine other candidates to win the seat. She is the current incumbent. On 6 June 2016, she was named State Minister for Investment and Privatization.

Controversies
In 2014, Evelyn Anite was involved in an argument with Margaret Baba Diri with the latter claiming that Evelyn Anite was vying for her political seat in Koboko for the 2016 general elections. In this dispute, Margaret Baba Diri claimed that Evelyn Anite was a "foreigner sowing confusion in Koboko and NRM". In response, Evelyn Anite claimed that she was only campaigning in Koboko to "relieve" her "mother" Baba Diri of the burden of "hectic politics".

In February 2014, during the NRM Parliamentary Caucus, ahead of the 2016 presidential elections, Evelyn Anite moved a resolution to declare President Yoweri Kaguta Museveni the official party flag bearer. The resolution that came to be known as the Kyankwanzi Resolution, was met with resistance.

In response to her support for the removal of the age limit bill, Evelyn Anite claimed that she had received multiple death threats. This prompted the government to give her a security detail. She also described fellow legislators who were opposed to the bill as "selfish hooligans".

Speaking in support of the removal of the age limit bill, Evelyn Anite that the ruling party had "the numbers and the national army on their side". The Uganda People's Defence Force (UPDF) has since distanced itself from this utterance.

In a letter to President Yoweri Kaguta Museveni in July 2018, Hamilton Telecom accused Evelyn Anite of discrediting the telecommunications firm from bidding for the purchase of Uganda Telecom (UTL).

In July 2018, it was alleged that Evelyn Anite had fled the country, on account of being under investigation following reports that allegedly solicited a $8 million (Shs 28.8billion) bribe from a group of Arab investors. She in turn sued a local newspaper for publishing the story about her.

Following her admission to Tufts University, a section of Ugandans living in the United States started a petition and carried out a demonstration demanding that her admission to the university be cancelled.

They alleged that the United States should not provide refuge for corrupt officials under the guise of further studies. Tufts University rejected the request stating that she had done nothing wrong to warrant her expulsion. They further added that as a student at the school of law, her privacy was protected.

In 2021 after Anite lost the National resistance movement flag bearer elections to Dr Charles Ayume, she withdrew the ambulance she had earlier donated to Koboko Health Center IV.

Personal life 
Evelyn Anite is married to Allan Kajik, a former deputy Resident District Commissioner of Kampala. They got married in 2011 and had 2 children as of 2018.

See also 

 Koboko District
 The Lugbara
 Lugbara Language
 Ugandan Cabinet

References

External links
 Website of the Parliament of Uganda

1984 births
Lugbara people
Living people
People from Koboko District
Government ministers of Uganda
21st-century Ugandan women politicians
21st-century Ugandan politicians
Uganda Christian University alumni
Members of the Parliament of Uganda
The Fletcher School at Tufts University alumni
Ugandan journalists
Ugandan women journalists
Women government ministers of Uganda
National Resistance Movement politicians
Women members of the Parliament of Uganda